AEK Bank 1826 (until 2006 Amtsersparniskasse Thun) is a Swiss regional bank providing services for the Thun region. It was founded in 1826 and is organized as a cooperative. The business area is the canton of Berne. The head office is located close to the Lake Thun.

References 
Article contains translated text from AEK Bank 1826 on the German Wikipedia retrieved on 10 March 2017.

External links 
Homepage

Banks of Switzerland
Cooperative banking in Europe
Banks established in 1826
Swiss companies established in 1826
Cooperatives in Switzerland